Lacinularia is a genus of rotifers belonging to the family Flosculariidae.

Species:

Lacinularia elliptica 
Lacinularia elongata 
Lacinularia flosculosa 
Lacinularia ismailoviensis 
Lacinularia ismaloviensis 
Lacinularia megalotrocha 
Lacinularia pedunculata 
Lacinularia racemosa
Lacinularia reticulata 
Lacinularia striolata

References

Flosculariidae